HortaPharm B.V. is a cannabis research and development business in the Netherlands.

History
The business was founded by David Paul Watson in 1990. He was soon joined by David W. Pate and eventually Robert C. Clarke. They obtained the first license issued by the Dutch government to permit a Cannabis research facility in the Netherlands. In 1998, HortaPharm B.V. began partnering with GW Pharmaceuticals to develop Cannabis varieties for the manufacture of pharmaceuticals.

Breeding
Using selective breeding and production control, HortaPharm created Cannabis strains that produce virtually single cannabinoids, approximately 98% tetrahydrocannabinol or cannabidiol, relative to the total of other cannabinoids present.

References

Cannabis cultivation
Cannabis research
Pharmaceutical companies of the Netherlands
Pharmaceutical companies established in 1990
1990 in cannabis
Cannabis in the Netherlands